Puthiyara Maliyakkal Taj (3 January 1956 – 29 July 1990), popularly known as P. M. Taj, was an Indian creative writer, actor, screenwriter, and director in Malayalam theatre. Taj wrote many plays during his short span of life and won several awards including the Sakthi Award, instituted in memory of the progressive Malayalam writer Cherukad, and the Kerala Sangeetha Nataka Akademi Award twice.

Selected works 
His plays include: Kudukka Athava Vishakkunnavante Vedantam, Kanallattom, Ravvunni, Pavathan Nadu, Perumbara, Mary Lawrence, Thalasthanathuninn Oru Vaarthayumilla, Kurukan Kunjaammante Vaal, Perumkallan, Priyapetta Avivahidhan, Chakram, Aalmarattam, Ambalakaalla, Uthram Thirunallinte Kalpana Pole, Ennum Ennum Priyapetta Amma, and Agraharam.

 Films 

 Uyarum Njan Nadake (1985)
 Atham Chitira Chothy (1986)
 Kurukkan Rajavayi (1987)
 P.C. 369 (1987)
 Njan Piranna Nattil (1985)
 Bali (1991)

 Awards and recognitions 

 Kerala Sangeetha Nataka Akademi Award in 1982 for Kudukka the gospel of hungry man Cherukaad Smaraka Shakthi Award in 1983
 Akilendhya Nadaka Award in 1983
 Kerala Sangeetha Nadaka Academy Award in 1989 for Paavathan Naad Calicut University took Perumbara as reference book in 1990
 Kerala University took Kudukka The gospel of hungry man as reference book in 2011

 References 

 
 Borne artiste. Indian Express. 11 August 1990. Calicut.
 
 Mega Jyothisudhan kshanika jeevitham, K.F George, Malayala Manorama, 28 August 1990, Calicut.
 Dhuranthangal irannu vaagiya oru kalaakaran. Madhyamam. 11 August 1990. Caliciut.
 Neru Kanda ee Kannukall porullarinja ee hridhayam''. K.S. Hariharan. Deshabhimani. 3 August 1990. Calicut.
 
  The Hindu. Monday, 28 March 2011
  The Hindu. 27 July 2010. Retrieved 20 April 2011
 
 
 
 
 
 
 
 
 
 
 
 
 
 

Malayalam-language dramatists and playwrights
Writers from Kozhikode
1956 births
Malayalam screenwriters
1990 deaths
Indian male dramatists and playwrights
20th-century Indian dramatists and playwrights
Screenwriters from Kerala
20th-century Indian male writers
20th-century Indian screenwriters